Labuche Kang III, also known as Labuche Kang East, is a mountain located on the Labuche Kang massif in Tibet Autonomous Region and is one of the highest unclimbed mountains in the world after Gangkhar Puensum. The former second highest unclimbed mountain, Saser Kangri II East was first climbed on August 24, 2011.

See also
 List of highest mountains
 List of Ultras of the Himalayas

References

Mountains of Tibet
Seven-thousanders of the Himalayas